Turon River, a perennial stream that is part of the Macquarie catchment within the Murray–Darling basin, is located in the central western district of New South Wales, Australia. Partly situated in the Turon National Park, the river is host to numerous recreational and tourist activities such as horse riding, gold panning, canoeing, camping, and seasonal fishing.

Geography
The Turon River rises on the western slopes of the Great Dividing Range in the Capertee Valley, west of Ben Bullen, and flows generally to the north west and then west, joined by the Crudine River, and then forms its confluence with the Macquarie River south west of Hill End; dropping  over the course of its  length.

The upper reaches of the Turon River are partly bound by Turon National Park, established in 2002, while the lower reaches open onto private grazing property.

The river is crossed by the Wallaby Rocks Bridge that carries the Hill End Road, located at Wallaby Rocks.

Gold rush
The Turon River is well renowned because it was the site of one of Australia's first alluvial gold rushes. During the gold rush Chinese migrant workers built a water race to bring water to mining operations along sections of the Turon River. Many parts of the race can still be seen today, such as at Turon Gates. The Turon River was the site of violence between miners and licensing authorities during the gold rush.

See also

 Sofala, New South Wales
 Rivers of New South Wales
 List of rivers of Australia

References

External links
 

Rivers of New South Wales
Murray-Darling basin
Australian gold rushes